Eddystone Rock (meaning "Eddies Rock") is a rock and reef located to the north of Falkland Sound in the Falkland Islands. It is 44 m (144 ft) high. There is a lighthouse here, which is named after a more famous light of the same name in England.

History
Some of the first people to sight the rock were the crew of Louis Antoine de Bougainville's ship, who named it the "Tower of Bissy".

Lieut. Lowcay during his 1837 survey of the Falkland Islands noted in his journal:

"Sunday, 10 Dec...At 8 a.m. observed the Eddystone; this remarkable rock lies off the entrance of Falkland Sound and making it from the eastward it has the appearance of a round island, and from the westward it looks like a sail."

Notes

References
 Cawkell, Mary The History of the Falkland Islands (Anthony Nelson, Oswestry, Shropshire, England, 2001)
 Southby-Tailyour, Ewen - Falkland Island Shores
 Toponymy of Falklands

Islands of the Falkland Islands